Dianne Emery (born 4 January 1984) is a road cyclist from South Africa. She represented her nation at the 2004 UCI Road World Championships.

References

External links
 profile at Procyclingstats.com

1984 births
South African female cyclists
Living people
Place of birth missing (living people)